Nick Patrick may refer to:

 Nick Patrick (actor), British actor
 Nicholas Patrick, British-born NASA astronaut
 Nick Patrick (referee), wrestling referee
 Nick Patrick (record producer), British record producer